Henri Brosselard-Faidherbe (1855–1893) was a French military officer and explorer.

Biography
Henri François Brosselard was born on 3 June 1855. On 30 October 1883 he married Mathilde-Marie Faidherbe, the daughter of General Louis Faidherbe. He was permitted to attach the surname of his father-in-law to his own. 
Brosselard was a member of the first expedition of Colonel Paul Flatters to explore a possible route for a Trans-Saharan railway.
Later he wrote a book on this and the second expedition, which ended in disaster.
He died on 19 August 1893 in Coutances, Manche at the age of 38.

Works
Les deux missions du Colonel Flatters en Afrique : récit historique et critique par un membre de la première mission, Paris, Dreyfous, 1884
Rapport sur la situation dans la vallée du Sénégal en 1886 : insurrection de Mahmadou-Lamine, 1888
La Guinée portugaise et les possessions françaises voisines, Lille, 1889, 116 p.
Les deux missions Flatters au pays des Touareg Azdjer et Hoggar, Paris, Jouvet, 1889, 304 p.
Rivières du Sud, Paris, Sous-secrétariat d'État des colonies, Imprimerie des Journaux officiels, 1891
Casamance et Mellacorée. Pénétration au Soudan, Paris, Librairie illustrée, 1892, 106 p. (original text )

See also
 Casamance
 History of Guinea-Bissau
 History of Senegal
 Tuareg

Notes

Further reading
 

French explorers
1855 births
1893 deaths